Falie Oelschig (born 14 January 1979) is a South African rugby union player for the  in the Currie Cup. He previously played for the Cheetahs in Super Rugby, the Free State Cheetahs and SWD Eagles in the Currie Cup and Vodacom Cup competitions and for Stade Français in the French Top 14.

References

1979 births
Living people
South African rugby union players
Eastern Province Elephants players
Stormers players
Sharks (rugby union) players
Cheetahs (rugby union) players
Free State Cheetahs players
Rugby union players from Bloemfontein
Rugby union scrum-halves
Afrikaner people
Alumni of Grey College, Bloemfontein
University of the Free State alumni
Stade Français players